Udmurtia, officially the Udmurt Republic, is a republic of Russia located in Eastern Europe. It is administratively part of the Volga Federal District. Its capital is the city of Izhevsk.

Name

The second part  means 'person' (cf. Komi , Mari ). Urdu ), which is thought to have been borrowed from the Indo-Aryan term  ('man, mortal, one who is bound to die'. cf. The Indo-Europeanists T. Gamkrelidze and V. Ivanov associate this word with horse-riding Altaic tribes in the Bronze Age.

On the other hand, in the Russian tradition, the name 'meadow people' refers to the inhabitants of the left bank of river in general.  Recently, the most relevant is the version of V. V. Napolskikh and S. K. Belykh. They suppose that ethnonym was borrowed either from Indo-Iranian  'outside, close, last, edge, limit, boundary' or Turkic-Altaic / 'oath (in fidelity), comrade, friend'.

History

On November 4, 1920, the Votyak Autonomous Oblast was formed. On January 1, 1932, it was renamed Udmurt Autonomous Oblast, which was then reorganized into the Udmurt ASSR on December 28, 1934. During World War II, many industrial factories were evacuated from the Ukrainian SSR and western borderlands to Udmurtia.

Geography
The republic is located to the west of the Ural Mountains and borders Kirov, Perm, Bashkortostan, and Tatarstan.

Udmurtia is a republic in the Russian Federation, located in Central Russia between the branches of two of the largest and oldest rivers in Europe: the Kama and its right tributary the Vyatka.

The city of Izhevsk is the administrative, industrial and cultural center of Udmurtia. Geographically, it is located not far from Moscow, the capital and largest city of the Russian Federation. The city has a well-developed transport system (including air, land, and water).

Udmurtia borders Kirov Oblast to the west and north, Perm Oblast to the east, and the Bashkortostan and Tatarstan Republics to the south.

Climate
The republic has a moderate continental climate, with warm summers and cold, snowy winters. Annual precipitation averages 400–600 mm.

Administrative divisions

Demographics
Population: 

Although as of 2007 the population was declining, the decline was stabilizing and was more pronounced in urban areas. Out of the 19,667 births reported in 2007, 12,631 were in urban areas (11.86 per 1,000) and 7,036 were in rural areas (14.88 per 1,000). Birth rates for rural areas are 25% higher than that of urban areas. Of the total of 21,727 deaths, 14,366 were reported in urban areas (13.49 per 1,000) and 7,361 were in rural areas (15.56 per 1,000). Natural decline of the population was measured at −0.16% for urban areas and an insignificant −0.07% for rural areas (the average for Russia was −0.33% in 2007).

Settlements

Vital statistics
Source

TFR source

Ethnic groups
According to the 2010 Census, Russians make up 62.2% of the republic's population, while the ethnic Udmurts make up only 28%. Other groups include Tatars (6.7%), Ukrainians (0.6%), Mari (0.6%), and a host of smaller groups, each accounting for less than 0.5% of the republic's total population.

Over two-thirds of the world population of Udmurts live in the republic.

Religious groups

According to a 2012 survey, 33.1% of the population of Udmurtia adheres to the Russian Orthodox Church, 5% are unaffiliated generic Christians, 2% are Eastern Orthodox Christian believers without belonging to any church or members of other Eastern Orthodox churches, 4% are Muslims, 2% of the population adheres to the Slavic native faith (Rodnovery) or to Udmurt Vos (Udmurt native faith), 1% adheres to forms of Protestantism, and 1% of the population are Old Believers. In addition, 29% of the population declares to be "spiritual but not religious," 19% is atheist, and 3.9% follows other religions or did not give an answer to the question.

The local Russian Orthodox Church is the Metropolitanate of Udmurtia, comprising the Eparchy of Izhevsk (founded 1927) under Bishop and Metropolitan Viktorin (Kostenkov) (2015), the Eparchy of Glazov (founded 1889) under Bishop Viktor (Sergeyev) and the Eparchy of Sarapul (founded 1868) under Bishop Anthony (Prostikhin) (2015).

Jews

Udmurt Jews are a special territorial group of the Ashkenazi Jews, which started to be formed in the residential areas of mixed Turkic-speaking (Tatars, Kryashens, Bashkirs, Chuvash people), Finno-Ugric-speaking (Udmurts, Mari people) and Slavic-speaking (Russians) population. The Ashkenazi Jews on the territory of the Udmurt Republic first appeared in the 1830s. The Udmurt Jewry had formed the local variety on the base of the Yiddish of Udmurtia till the 1930s and features of Yiddish of migrants "joined" into it (in the 1930s and 1940s); as a result up to the 1970s and 1980s the Udmurt variety of Yiddish (Udmurtish) was divided into two linguistic subgroups: the central subgroup (with centers Izhevsk, Sarapul, and Votkinsk) and the southern subgroup (with centers Kambarka, Alnashi, Agryz and Naberezhnye Chelny). One of the characteristic features of the Udmurtish is a noticeable number of Udmurt and Tatar loan words.

Culture

Udmurt folklore is understood both in a broad sense (- folk knowledge, folk wisdom), and in a narrower one (- folk poetry, oral poetry). In everyday life, folklore is not divided into genres, it is perceived in unity with material culture, with religious, legal and ethical aspects. Popular terms-definitions have incorporated the ritual action, symbolically figurative and magically forming words, musical and choreographic behavior

Notes

References

Sources

"СССР. Административно-территориальное деление союзных республик. 1987." (USSR. Administrative-Territorial Structure of the Union Republics. 1987) / Составители В. А. Дударев, Н. А. Евсеева. — М.: Изд-во «Известия Советов народных депутатов СССР», 1987. — 673 с.

Further reading
Kalder, Daniel. Lost Cosmonaut: Observations of an Anti-tourist. Scribner Book Company. .

External links

 Official website of the Udmurt Republic

 
Russian-speaking countries and territories
Regions of Europe with multiple official languages
States and territories established in 1990
1990 establishments in Russia
1990 establishments in the Soviet Union